Henry Gregory Thompson, O.S.B. (1871–1942) was a Welsh-born Roman Catholic prelate who served as the Bishop of Gibraltar from 1910 to 1927.

Born in Mold, Flintshire, Wales on 27 March 1871, he was ordained a priest of the Order of Saint Benedict on 19 October 1902. He was appointed the Bishop of the Diocese of Gibraltar by Pope Pius X on 10 November 1910. His consecration to the Episcopate took place on 21 December 1910; the principal consecrator was the Right Reverend Peter Amigo, Bishop of Southwark, with the Right Reverend Frederick Keating, Bishop of Northampton (later Archbishop of Liverpool) and the Right Reverend Francis Mostyn, Bishop of Menevia (later Archbishop of Cardiff), serving as co-consecrators.

Bishop Thompson resigned the episcopal see of Gibraltar on 25 May 1927 and appointed Titular Bishop of Thermopylae on 15 July 1927. He died on 27 October 1942, aged 71.

References

1871 births
1942 deaths
20th-century Roman Catholic bishops of Gibraltar
People from Mold, Flintshire